Ali Abdul-Kadhim (born 28 November 1965) is a former Iraqi football forward who played for Iraq at the 1988 Arab Nations Cup. 

Abdul-Kadhim played for Iraq between 1987 and 1988.

References

Iraqi footballers
Iraq international footballers
Living people
Association football forwards
1965 births